Caloptilia rhodorella is a moth of the family Gracillariidae. It is known from Nova Scotia, Canada.

The larvae feed on Rhododendron canadense and Rhodora species. They mine the leaves of their host plant.

References

rhodorella
Moths of North America
Moths described in 1954